Tetsurō, Tetsuro, Tetsurou or Tetsuroh (written: 哲郎, 哲朗, 鉄郎, 徹郎 or テツロー in katakana) is a masculine Japanese given name. Notable people with the name include:

, Japanese anime director
, Japanese anime director
, Japanese comedian
, Japanese politician
, Japanese shogi player
, Japanese primatologist
, Japanese footballer and manager
, Japanese aikidoka
, Japanese basketball player
, Japanese politician
, Japanese composer, record producer and singer-songwriter
, Japanese footballer
, Japanese actor and voice actor
Tetsuro Shigematsu, Canadian radio broadcaster and comedian
, Japanese curler
, Japanese actor
, Japanese footballer and manager
, Japanese moral philosopher, cultural historian, and intellectual historian
, Japanese politician
, Japanese architect

Fictional characters
, protagonist of the manga series Galaxy Express 999
, a character in the manga series Haikyu!! with the position of captain and middle blocker from Nekoma High

See also
17501 Tetsuro, a main-belt asteroid

Japanese masculine given names